Noel Lee Haggard (born September 4, 1963) is an American country music artist.

Haggard is the son of country music legend Merle Haggard. He was signed to a recording deal with Atlantic Records and released his debut album, One Lifetime, in 1997. The album produced two singles, both of which peaked at No. 75 on the Billboard Hot Country Singles & Tracks chart.

His first single, "Once You Learn," also peaked at No. 72 on the RPM Country Tracks chart in Canada. His second single, "Tell Me Something Bad About Tulsa," was covered by George Strait on his 2003 album Honkytonkville. Strait's version of the song peaked at No. 11 on the Hot Country Singles & Tracks chart.

Haggard was also featured on the soundtrack of the 1994 film Maverick as a member of the "Maverick Choir.". Noel was a member of the Strangers and opened up shows for Merle his whole professional life. He continues to perform with the remaining Strangers  and his brother Ben, since the passing of Merle.

One Lifetime (1997)

Track listing
"Cowgirl Blues" (Luke Reed, Phil Thomas) - 3:58
"You Ain't in It" (Shawn Camp, Tim Mensy) - 2:52
"Once You Learn" (Billy Livsey, Don Schlitz) - 3:16
"Palm of My Hand" (Gene Dobbins, Mensy) - 3:31
"Wishin' on a Lone Star" (Jess Brown, Brett Jones) - 3:13
"One Life Time" (Buddy Brock, Michael Huffman, Rick Williamson) - 3:14
"Left, Leavin', Goin' or Gone" (Frank J. Myers, Don Pfrimmer) - 2:48
"I've Learned to Live" (Dean Dillon, Frank Dycus) - 3:53
"I Can't" (Brown, Jones) - 3:38
"Tell Me Something Bad About Tulsa" (Red Lane) - 3:13

Personnel
Eddie Bayers - drums
Barry Beckett - keyboards
Paul Franklin - steel guitar
Noel Haggard - lead vocals
Owen Hale - drums
Terry McMillan - percussion
Phil Naish - keyboards
Bobby Ogdin - keyboards
Don Potter - acoustic guitar
Michael Rhodes - bass guitar
Brent Rowan - electric guitar
John Wesley Ryles - background vocals
Joe Spivey - fiddle
Harry Stinson - background vocals
Billy Joe Walker Jr. - acoustic guitar
Willie Weeks - bass guitar
Dennis Wilson - background vocals
Curtis Young - background vocals

Singles

Music videos

References

External links
[ allmusic ((( Noel Haggard > Overview )))]

1963 births
American country singer-songwriters
American male singer-songwriters
Living people
Atlantic Records artists
Musicians from Bakersfield, California
Singer-songwriters from California
Country musicians from California
The Strangers (American band) members